Vocal trance is a subgenre of trance music that focuses on vocals and melodies.  The subgenre came into existence in the early 1990s, when trance was still developing. Although many early trance records used vocal samples mixed in with the beats, the earliest examples of the style appeared in 1992–93.

Characteristics 

A typical track consists of three elements, though later tracks labeled vocal trance may not include all of them. A track begins with an intro of progressive beats. The melodic part starts incrementally, combining vocals, usually female, a melodic sound (for the most part high pitched and fast), and a bass pattern. Towards the end of the track, the melody fades out and the intro rhythm returns, usually with some minor changes.

Vocal trance producers frequently make use of session musicians, particularly female singers, for vocals on their tracks. Session vocalists have been featured on tracks that span different genres and subgenres, while some vocalists have chosen to work only within the electronic club and dance music genres.

Europe
From 1997–2004, this music style was mostly progressive and uplifting trance with mostly female vocals. It was dominated by German-based productions, and spread all over Europe because of Viva, Onyx.tv and MTV2 Pop satellite music channels. TMF Belgium/Holland (and JIM Belgium during the 2000s) followed by promoting their own vocal trance productions, which became more commercially successful in UK and Spain. UK also has a share on the vocal trance scene, but in a more underground level.

After the summer of 2004
After summer 2004, vocal trance became less common on European music TV channels.  This coincided with Viacom UK (MTV / VH1) taking control of both the TMF Nederland / Belgium and VIVA Germany music channels.  The channels changed their playlists, emphasizing other music styles such as United States urban contemporary and contemporary R&B, especially those with an overt rap music presence as well as British electro and local rap and hip hop scenes.

Since 2004, vocal trance has only been aired on non-Viacom music channels, including "Jim" from Belgium, "ZTV" from Viasat, and the show "I'm was mashed in..." from the British MTV Dance that airs the older videos. The former British channel Flaunt aired vocal trance hits, as does the German music station "iMusic1 TV" and the French channel M6Music Pop. There is a digital terrestrial channel in Netherlands, called "TMF Party", that airs some new vocal trance hits. In Poland, there is a music channel called "4fun TV" that broadcasts recent vocal trance hits from Belgium. Czechs can hear vocal trance music on the "Party Ride" program on the "Ocko" music channel.  The Spanish fans of vocal trance, can watch older vocal trance hits, as a part of the show "Disco 2000" on MTV Spain. The "Sol Espana" music station also airs vocal trance hits on the show "Techno Archives". Clubland TV, a British Free-to-air channel that broadcasts on Astra, plays vocal trance hits of the last decade.

Since mid-2006, the Internet has become a major source of vocal trance music videos. During 2006–7, some artists friendly to vocal trance (like Tiësto, Ian Van Dahl and Paul Van Dyk) were forced to alter their music style to remain viewable to the European music channels.  As of 2010, mainly Belgium, Scandinavian and French artists produce vocal trance music. In the U.K., elements of vocal trance can be traced in the Scouse house music style.

Armin Van Buuren hosts a weekly radio show called A State of Trance where vocal trance can still be listened to. The show is broadcast to more than 37 million weekly listeners in 84 countries on over 100 FM radio stations. According to Djs And Festivals, "the radio show propelled him to stardom and helped cultivate an interest in trance music around the world."

In January 2017, the Canadian label Monstercat released the vocal trance song "Saving Light" by Gareth Emery, Standerwick, and singer Haliene. The song became the first trance song to chart to #1 on the dance music Beatport overall charts in over 5 years, and was voted "Tune of the Year" for 2017 on Armin van Buuren's radio show A State of Trance.

North America 
In the early 2000s, vocal trance artists became successful in the North American market. In 1999, Canadian group Delerium and vocalist Sarah McLachlan released the vocal trance song "Silence", of which a remix made by Tiesto charted worldwide.

Vocal trance remains moderately popular in the United States and compilations such as Ministry of Sound reach Gold and Platinum status. Vocal trance artists, such as Nadia Ali and Ian Van Dahl, have charted albums and singles on such American charts as the Top Electronic Albums, Hot Dance Airplay and Hot Dance Singles Sales charts.

See also 
 List of vocal trance artists

References 

Trance genres

de:Trance (Musik)#Vocal Trance
it:Trance (musica)#Sottogeneri